The Cape Government Railways 4th Class 4-6-0TT of 1882 was a South African steam locomotive from the pre-Union era in the Cape of Good Hope.

In 1882 and 1883, the Cape Government Railways placed sixty-eight   tank-and-tender locomotives in mainline service on all three its Systems. It was an improved version of the 4th Class locomotives of 1880 and 1881 and was delivered in two versions, built by two manufacturers.

Thirty-three of these locomotives were built by Robert Stephenson and Company, with Stephenson valve gear. Twelve of them were still in service when the South African Railways was established in 1912, including three which had been sold to the Kowie Railway.

Manufacturers

The 4th Class 4-6-0TT tank-and-tender locomotive of 1880 had been designed by Michael Stephens, at that stage the Locomotive Superintendent of the Western System of the Cape Government Railways (CGR) in Cape Town. This improved version was delivered to the CGR in 1882 and 1883. The contracts for their construction were divided between Robert Stephenson and Company and Neilson and Company. Neilson's built thirty-five locomotives with Joy valve gear.

Thirty-three were built by Stephenson's, with Stephenson valve gear. Of these, nine locomotives went to the Western System, operating out of Cape Town, and were numbered in the range from W47 to W55. Twenty went to the Midland System, operating out of Port Elizabeth, and were numbered in the range from M58 to M75, M84 and M85. Four went to the Eastern System, operating out of East London, and were numbered in the range from E35 to E38.

Characteristics
All these locomotives had  diameter coupled wheels, unlike the six 4th Class locomotives which had been delivered to the Eastern System in 1880 and 1881, which had smaller  diameter coupled wheels. These 33 locomotives were delivered with Stephenson valve gear, like their predecessors of 1880 and 1881.

Since these locomotives were delivered with permanently coupled tenders, their cabs did not need side entrances with double handrails, like their predecessors of 1880 and 1881 did with their optional tenders. Access was by pairs of steps, mounted on the engine as well as on the tender, with one handrail attached to the engine and the other to the tender.

Modifications
On the Eastern System, problems were experienced with the low-grade local coal from the Cyphergat and Molteno collieries in the Stormberg. It had a high content of non-combustible material which often caused delays, since it required frequent stops to allow the stoker to clear the grate of clinker and ash, a tedious task which required the locomotive to be stationary.

John D. Tilney, the Eastern System Locomotive Superintendent, carried out many experiments in an attempt to overcome the coal problem. Some of these involved modifying some of the 4th Class locomotives in order to install oscillating firebars and larger fireboxes.

Another modification by Tilney was an extended smokebox, to make room for a very efficient spark arrester which was constructed of wire mesh. Several locomotives were altered to incorporate these spark arresters, as shown in the photograph alongside of a locomotive with an extended smokebox.

Tilney's initiatives did not pass unnoticed. In 1881, the General Manager appointed Hawthorne R. Thornton as Chief Locomotive Superintendent for the whole of the Cape of Good Hope, in response to the "growing tendency on the part of the several Locomotive Superintendents to bring in modifications of designs in essential parts of the engines and rolling stock".

After Michael Stephens retired and H.M. Beatty took over as Chief Locomotive Superintendent of the CGR in 1896, two of the locomotives were converted to regular tender engines by removing their side-tanks.

Service

Cape Government Railways

At the time these 4th Class locomotives entered service, the two Eastern System mainlines were open to King William's Town and approaching Sterkstroom respectively. Those of the Midland System were completed to Graaff Reinet and approaching Cradock respectively, while the Western System mainline was open to Beaufort West.

All these locomotives were renumbered more than once during their service lives on the CGR. By 1886, the system prefixes had been done away with and the Midland System's locomotives had all been renumbered by replacing the letter prefix "M" with the numeral "1". The Western System locomotives were allocated new numbers in the 100 range. By 1888, the Eastern System locomotives had been renumbered into the 600 number range. The Midland System locomotives were renumbered twice more, into the 200 number range by 1890 and into the 400 number range by 1899. All these renumberings are listed in the table below.

Kowie Railway
At some stage after 1904, three of these locomotives, numbers 470, 471 and 477, were sold to the Kowie Railway Company, which operated a line between Port Alfred and Grahamstown. They were renumbered 1, 3 and 2 respectively.

South African Railways
When the Union of South Africa was established on 31 May 1910, the three Colonial government railways (CGR, Natal Government Railways and Central South African Railways) were united under a single administration to control and administer the railways, ports and harbours of the Union. Although the South African Railways and Harbours came into existence in 1910, the actual classification and renumbering of all the rolling stock of the three constituent railways was only implemented with effect from 1 January 1912.

By 1912, nine locomotives survived. They were considered obsolete by the South African Railways, designated Class 04 and renumbered by having the numeral "0" prefixed to their existing numbers. Despite being considered obsolete, some of them were still being employed as shunting locomotives in Port Elizabeth in 1932. The rest had been scrapped by 1918.

Works numbers
The works numbers, years built, original numbers, renumbering and disposal of the Cape 4th Class of 1882 are listed in the table.

References

0340
0340
4-6-0 locomotives
2′C n2t locomotives
Robert Stephenson and Company locomotives
Cape gauge railway locomotives
Railway locomotives introduced in 1882
1882 in South Africa
Scrapped locomotives